The 2012–13 Toluca season was the 66th professional season of Mexico's top-flight football league. The season is split into two tournaments—the Torneo Apertura and the Torneo Clausura—each with identical formats and each contested by the same eighteen teams. Toluca began their season on July 22, 2012 against Guadalajara, Toluca played their homes games on Sundays at 12:00pm local time. Toluca was runner-up in the final phase in the Apertura tournament losing the final to Tijuana, while they did not qualify to the final phase in the Clausura tournament.

Torneo Apertura

Squad

Regular season

Apertura 2012 results

Final phase

Toluca advanced 5–2 on aggregate

Toluca advanced 3–2 on aggregate

Tijuana won 4–1 on aggregate

Goalscorers

Regular season

Source:

Final phase

Results

Results summary

Results by round

Copa MX

Group stage

Apertura results

Knockout stage

Goalscorers

Results

Results by round

Torneo Clausura

Squad

Regular season

Clausura 2013 results

Toluca did not qualify to the Final Phase

Goalscorers

Results

Results summary

Results by round

Copa Libertadores

Group 1

Second stage

Copa Libertadores results

Goalscorers

Results

Results summary

Results by round

References

Mexican football clubs 2012–13 season